Youssef Kaddioui Idrissi (born 28 September 1984 in El Jadida) is a Moroccan international footballer who plays as a winger .

Career
Keddioui won the 2008 Coupe du Trône with FAR Rabat.

Keddioui played for the "B" Morocco national football team in a 2009 African Championship of Nations qualifying match against Algeria on 3 May 2008.

In July 2009, Keddioui joined Saudi Arabian Professional League side Al-Wehda Club.

In January 2019, Keddioui was loaned out to RCA Zemamra from FAR Rabat.

References

External links
Youssef Kaddioui at Footballdatabase

1984 births
Living people
Moroccan footballers
Moroccan expatriate footballers
Difaâ Hassani El Jadidi players
Al-Wehda Club (Mecca) players
Wydad AC players
Al Kharaitiyat SC players
Al Dhafra FC players
Raja CA players
Expatriate footballers in Saudi Arabia
Expatriate footballers in Qatar
Expatriate footballers in the United Arab Emirates
People from El Jadida
2013 Africa Cup of Nations players
Qatar Stars League players
Saudi Professional League players
UAE Pro League players
Qatari Second Division players
Association football midfielders
Morocco international footballers